The Suburban Trib was a three-day-a-week newspaper, albeit with its own staff and policies, inserted into suburban issues of the Chicago Tribune.  The Suburban Trib operated from 1967 until it was discontinued in 1985 in favor of regional editions of the Chicago Tribune.

References
Shapiro, Michael (2004) "No News is Good News", Columbia Journalism Review, July/August 2004.

Chicago Tribune
Defunct newspapers published in Chicago
Newspapers established in 1967
Publications disestablished in 1984